Cycling at the 2022 Commonwealth Games was held between 29 July and 7 August 2022 at four different venues. There were 26 events altogether in cycling, making the sport third-highestt in terms of number of medals available. There were 20 events in track cycling (including four for para-cycling), two in mountain biking, two in road time trials and two in road racing.

Schedule
The competition schedule was as follows:

Venues
Three of the four cycling venues were located within the West Midlands region:

Myton Fields was the start/finish location for a road race course that circulated through Warwick and Leamington Spa.
West Park in Wolverhampton was the start/finish location for a road time trial course that stretched to Dudley.
Cannock Chase Forest was the venue for mountain biking.

In addition, it was decided that the Lee Valley VeloPark in London, more than 100 miles away from Birmingham, would host the track cycling. This caused  backlash amongst residents in the West Midlands, and even resulted in a petition that was signed by 6,000 locals that urged for a new velodrome to be built in the West Midlands instead of using one in London. Nonetheless, a new velodrome in the West Midlands was ruled out on grounds of cost.

Qualification (parasport)

A total of 12 para-track cyclists (6 per gender) nominally qualified to compete at the Games. They qualify as follows:
 Athletes in the UCI Individual Tandem B – Track Para Rankings (for performances between 1 January 2021 and 18 April 2022).
 Recipient of a CGF / UCI Bipartite Invitation.

Medal summary

Medal table

Medalists

Road cycling

Mountain biking

Track cycling

Men 

1.  Repecharge athlete

Women

Para-track cycling

References

External links
Official website: 2022 Commonwealth Games – Cycling - Mountain Bike
Official website: 2022 Commonwealth Games – Cycling - Road Cycling
Official website: 2022 Commonwealth Games – Cycling - Time Trial
Official website: 2022 Commonwealth Games – Cycling - Track and Para Track

Cycling at the 2022 Commonwealth Games
Cycling at the Commonwealth Games
Commonwealth Games
2022 Commonwealth Games events
Para-cycling
International cycle races hosted by England
Parasports competitions